Mostafa Heravi (born in 1974 in Mashhad, Iran) is an Iranian filmmaker, photographer, and visual artist currently residing in Netherlands.

Early life
Mostafa Heravi was born in 1974 in Mashhad, Iran. He was raised in a conservative, religious family who, from early childhood, encouraged him to take up drawing, reciting the Quran and calligraphy. Heravi pursued painting in the presence of several master artists, including Hossein Talebi and Amir Khajehamiri.

Career

Music videos
Since childhood, the first thing he was willing to pursue was music, but he could never do so due to living conditions. Therefore, he started his artistic career by painting. While living in Mashhad, he and his friend ran a hair salon to pursue painting. He then moved to Tehran to try theater and also photography. Still, he never took any of them seriously until he entered the university and chose cinema and film-making as his main career.

He received a degree in Audiovisual art from the Gerrit Rietveld Academie of Amsterdam. From 2006 to 2010, Heravi worked at the Radio Zamaneh studios. He now works as a filmmaker, photographer, and visual artist in Amsterdam. Heravi is known for his critical social approach.

In 2009, he started to make music videos, the first of which was for exiled, avant-garde Iranian singer Mohsen Namjoo named "Gladiators" that no media outlet would play because of its content. Apart from his collaboration with Namjoo, Heravi has also made music videos for Shahin Najafi; another Iranian singer, singer, songwriter and political activist who is strongly hated by Iranian regime.

In 2011, he produced a music video for rock band khak named "Tanham Nazar" (Don't Leave Me Alone). Mostafa Heravi is director of photography of the 2012 "Kiosk: A Generation Destroyed by Madness". It's a music documentary written and directed by Ala Mohseni which is a review of forty-something-year of Iran's history after Islamic revolution along with the Kiosk band tours. Heravi's first collaboration with Kiosk was in 2008 in which he made the official music video for their version of Ay from bia (Persian: ای یارم بیا) which features Mohsen Namjoo as guest singer. Some shots accompany it from the surrealistic movie The Color of Pomegranates by Armenian director Sergei Paradjanov.

He also directed "Bedrood" (Farewell) in 2016, a song by the Amsterdam-based band, Panida. In 2017, Mostafa Heravi directed a music video for Omid Noori, pioneer of opera music in Afghanistan, called "Orouj" (Ascension), which is about the brutal murder of Farkhunda Malikzada who was accused of burning Quran. Majid Kazemi and Faarjam are among the other Iranian singers/bands Mostafa Heravi has made music videos for.

Film director
As for the graduation project, Mostafa Heravi wrote and directed a short film (19 minutes) named Dawn (Persian: شفق) in 2007, which won several awards, including best Dutch students' movie of the year and public award at the TENTAcademy Awards in 2oo7. Dawn is a short film about a pub where only one customer notices all the changes. While the other customers keep to themselves, the Iranian man tries to tackle the problems of the café.

 It is written, (Persian: کتیبه) is a short movie written and directed by Mostafa Heravi in 2006 featuring Leena Tolonen as dancer/actor. In the film, a woman in a chador dance to Iranian Rock/Folk musician Farhad Mehrad's song: Katibeh. "It is written" shows us how it would look if a woman were allowed to live freely in a Patriarchal society. Heravi emphasizes the fate of womankind and the results of freedom of action. It was screened at Women's Voices Now (WVN) theme of which was "Women's Voices from the Muslim World: A Short Film Festival" and won the second place in Experimental section.
 Mostaghim Tahe Khat (Persian: مستقیم ته خط) is the name of an independent 2017 Sunday show produced by Mostafa Heravi, initially broadcast on YouTube. In each episode which lasts about 30 minutes, he would interview a featured guest (an Iranian artist or journalist) each week about the matter while Heravi driving in the streets and hosting the show. Hamed Ahmadi as the head writer, Soroush Mehrani as the cameraman, and Faarjam Saeedi as the composer are the other co-creators of the program. This project is currently discontinued after 13 episodes due to lack of a sponsor.
 It Was 5 in the Morning (Persian: ساعت ۵ صبح بود) is a 2018 Iranian film directed, written, and edited by Mostafa Heravi. It features Iranian artists who address the death penalty practice in Iran through their art. Artists like Shahin Najafi, Mana Neyestani, Boshra Dastournezhad and Shabnam Tolouei among others. The movie deals with widespread use and practice of death penalty and public executions which often happen at five o’clock in the morning; the reason why the movie is named this way. Director tells his story by using images and little words.

The film begins with a song from the snow-covered forest. Every one of the actors narrates their stories of the death penalty in Iran. A small wooden stool resembling execution acts as a bridge throughout the movie to connect Each episode to the other. The final shot of the movie was recorded in sheer silence. It depicted Gohar Eshghi sitting still on the same stool along with the mother of Sattar Beheshti, who was an Iranian worker and blogger arrested for his online writing in detention, then killed under torture.

Technical Editor
 Hayedeh: Legendary Persian Diva (Persian: سخن از هایده) is a 2009 documentary film about the late Iranian iconic singer Hayedeh, made by the exiled musician and journalist Pejman Akbarzadeh in The Netherlands. The 100-minute documentary was filmed in France, Germany, the Netherlands, the United Kingdom, and the United States. Mostafa Heravi edited this movie in collaboration with Gregory Macousi. The language of the film is Persian. Hayedeh was released on 20 January 2010, the 20th death anniversary of Hayedeh. The DVD was released by Persian Dutch Network in Amsterdam.

Fine art photographer
As a visual artist, he is simultaneously working on photography and his artwork was previously shown at galleries in the US and in the Netherlands. This Dutch-based Iranian artist has published works focusing on the "woman" in recent years, which have had widespread repercussions in social networks and have received various responses. His photography also consists of political and pop culture images Photoshopped to create surreal, poignant statements.

Iran, The Road Ahead is a festival held by Zamaneh Foundation in Amsterdam, the Netherlands, on Friday, 6 October 2015, on its tenth anniversary. A festival in which notable speakers attended, including Nobel Peace Prize laureate Shirin Ebadi, Masih Alinejad, founder of My Stealthy Freedom, Rieneke Van Santen, executive director of Zamaneh Media, Marietje Schaake, Member of European Parliament and also Kees van Baar, the Human Rights Ambassador in the Netherlands. In that festival Heravi's photos were exhibited along with a 10-minute video of him with the same name as the festival about Iranian influencers on social media and their followers which portrays bitter truths about emerging superficial role models.

Mostafa Heravi exhibited his photography in Stories for Freedom Festival Rotterdam in May and June 2019, an event in which other prominent Iranian artists performed, including: Hamed Ahmadi (writer), Shahyar Ghanbari (poet), Sahand Sahebdivani (storytelling) & Faarjam (music). The main theme of his works are women, religion and politics.

References

External links

 Official Instagram page

1974 births
Living people
Iranian music video directors
Iranian film directors
Iranian experimental filmmakers
Iranian photographers
Audiovisual artists
Fine art photographers
Iranian emigrants to the Netherlands
People from Mashhad